Vvedensky (masculine), Vvedenskaya (feminine), or Vvedenskoye (neuter) is the name of several rural localities in Russia.

Modern localities
Vvedensky, Belgorod Oblast, a khutor in Vvedeno-Gotnyansky Rural Okrug of Rakityansky District in Belgorod Oblast; 
Vvedensky, Oryol Oblast, a settlement in Bagrinovsky Selsoviet of Bolkhovsky District in Oryol Oblast; 
Vvedensky, Voronezh Oblast, a settlement in Novochigolskoye Rural Settlement of Talovsky District in Voronezh Oblast
Vvedenskoye, Furmanovsky District, Ivanovo Oblast, a selo in Furmanovsky District of Ivanovo Oblast
Vvedenskoye, Komsomolsky District, Ivanovo Oblast, a village in Komsomolsky District of Ivanovo Oblast
Vvedenskoye, Kostroma Oblast, a selo in Petrovskoye Settlement of Chukhlomsky District in Kostroma Oblast; 
Vvedenskoye, Vvedensky Selsoviet, Ketovsky District, Kurgan Oblast, a selo in Vvedensky Selsoviet of Ketovsky District in Kurgan Oblast; 
Vvedenskoye, Zheleznodorozhny Selsoviet, Ketovsky District, Kurgan Oblast (or Vvedensky), a settlement in Zheleznodorozhny Selsoviet of Ketovsky District in Kurgan Oblast; 
Vvedenskoye, Mishkinsky District, Kurgan Oblast, a selo in Vvedensky Selsoviet of Mishkinsky District in Kurgan Oblast; 
Vvedenskoye, Kursk Oblast, a selo in Shumakovsky Selsoviet of Kursky District in Kursk Oblast
Vvedenskoye, Leningrad Oblast (or Vvedenskaya), a village under the administrative jurisdiction of Vyritskoye Settlement Municipal Formation in Gatchinsky District of Leningrad Oblast; 
Vvedenskoye, Domodedovo, Moscow Oblast (or Vvedenskaya), a selo under the administrative jurisdiction of Domodedovo Town Under Oblast Jurisdiction in Moscow Oblast; 
Vvedenskoye, Klinsky District, Moscow Oblast, a village under the administrative jurisdiction of the Town of Klin in Klinsky District of Moscow Oblast; 
Vvedenskoye, Lotoshinsky District, Moscow Oblast, a village in Mikulinskoye Rural Settlement of Lotoshinsky District in Moscow Oblast; 
Vvedenskoye, Odintsovsky District, Moscow Oblast, a selo in Zakharovskoye Rural Settlement of Odintsovsky District in Moscow Oblast; 
Vvedenskoye, Pushkinsky District, Moscow Oblast, a village in Tsarevskoye Rural Settlement of Pushkinsky District in Moscow Oblast; 
Vvedenskoye, Oryol Oblast, a selo in Vakhnovsky Selsoviet of Livensky District in Oryol Oblast; 
Vvedenskoye, Bezhetsky District, Tver Oblast, a village in Laptikhinskoye Rural Settlement of Bezhetsky District in Tver Oblast
Vvedenskoye, Bulatovskoye Rural Settlement, Kashinsky District, Tver Oblast, a village in Bulatovskoye Rural Settlement of Kashinsky District in Tver Oblast
Vvedenskoye, Farafonovskoye Rural Settlement, Kashinsky District, Tver Oblast, a selo in Farafonovskoye Rural Settlement of Kashinsky District in Tver Oblast
Vvedenskoye, Yaroslavl Oblast, a selo in Klimovsky Rural Okrug of Nekrasovsky District in Yaroslavl Oblast

Alternative names
Vvedenskaya, alternative name of Vvedenskaya Gotnya, a selo in Vvedeno-Gotnyansky Rural Okrug of Rakityansky District in Belgorod Oblast; 
Vvedenskoye, alternative name of Vedenye, a selo in Vlasovskoye Settlement of Oktyabrsky District in Kostroma Oblast; 
Vvedenskoye, alternative name of Vvedenka, a selo in Vvedensky Selsoviet of Lipetsky District in Lipetsk Oblast; 
Vvedenskoye, alternative name of Klementyevo, a village in Klementyevskoye Rural Settlement of Mozhaysky District in Moscow Oblast;

See also
Vedensky (inhabited locality)